European Episode is an album by American jazz saxophonist Lee Konitz and French pianist Martial Solal recorded in Italy in 1968 and released on the Campi label.

Track listing 
 "Collage on Standards" (Johnny Dinamo) - 16:25
 "Duet for Saxophone and Drums and Piano" (Dinamo) - 5:58
 "Anthropology" [Version 1] (Charlie Parker, Dizzy Gillespie) - 7:35
"Lover Man" [Version 2] (Jimmy Davis, Ram Ramirez, Jimmy Sherman) - 6:23
 "Roman Blues" [Version 1] - 8:25

Personnel 
Lee Konitz – alto saxophone
Martial Solal – piano
Henri Texier – bass 
Daniel Humair – drums

References 

Lee Konitz albums
Martial Solal albums
1968 albums